The National Academy of Customs, Indirect Taxes and Narcotics (NACIN) formerly known as  National Academy of Customs Excise and Narcotics (NACEN) is the apex civil service training  institute of Government of India for capacity building of civil servants in the field of indirect taxation, particularly the areas of customs, GST, central excise, service tax and narcotics control administration. Located at Faridabad, near India's capital New Delhi, the Academy is operated under the aegis of the Central Board of Indirect Taxes and Customs, Department of Revenue, Ministry of Finance, Government of India.

Training for Group A staff and overseas trainees is conducted at main campus at Faridabad, and the training of the Group B and Group C officers is conducted at various zonal and regional training centres across India. The main campus runs the flagship training programme for the Group A probationers officers of the indirect taxation branch Indian Revenue Service, better known as IRS (Customs & Indirect Tax) which administers GST, Customs and Narcotics. These officer trainees, also known as direct recruits, are selected through the Civil Services Examination conducted by the Union Public Service Commission.

History
In 1955, the institute started as a training school in a small building at Daryaganj in Old Delhi, which first relocated to Rajendra Place in Hauz Khas in South Delhi, then to Pushpa Bhawan in Saket in Delhi, finally it relocated to its present 23 acre permanent campus at Faridabad in 1996.

Organisation 
NACIN functions under the administrative control of the Central Board of Indirect Taxes & Customs, Department of Revenue, Ministry of Finance, Government of India. NACIN is headed by a Director General, who is a senior civil servant of India, belonging to the Indian Revenue Service who is of the rank of Additional Secretary to Government of India. The Director General is assisted by Additional Director Generals, Additional Directors, Deputy Directors and Assistant Directors.

Main campus at Faridabad

Academics and training

Courses for MoF officers 
Over the last two decades, NACIN along with its nine regional training institutes, has been conducting the professional training programme for officer trainees of the Indian Revenue Service (Customs & Indirect Tax).

Group A officers
Starting in the last week of December each year, after the three-month long Foundation Course at Lal Bahadur Shastri National Academy of Administration, the professional training programme involves over eighteen months of class room and on-the job-training. Officer trainees are trained in the administration of customs, Goods and service tax, excise and service taxes, Service Tax, VAT. Valuation, Audit, and Enforcement through a combination of class room sessions and visits to departmental locations across the length and breadth of the country.

The Academy also conducts Mid-Career Training Programs for officers of the Indian Revenue Service (Customs & Central GST) at the transition to specific milestones of their tenure.

Group B and C officers
Apart from training of the Group A direct recruits, NACIN and its regional training institutes also conduct induction training for its Group B (both Gazetted and Non-Gazetted) and Group C officers of the service. In-service training programs are organised for officers of Government of India across several departments in the field of customs, GST, central excise, service Tax, drug laws, green customs, cyber security, anti-money laundering, Weapons of Mass Destruction, Fake Indian Currency Notes, Intellectual Property Rights, among other subjects. These enable the field officers to develop requisite skills for keeping pace with the current international developments and the changing tax administration scenario in the country.

Training for others

GoI departments
In addition, sensitisation to the working of other stakeholders is built through short training modules with organisations such as Wildlife institute of India, Indian Coast Guard , Indian Navy, central Bureau of Narcotics, National Police Academy, National Industrial Security Academy, BSF, ITBP.

World Customs Organization's staff 
NACIN is the World Customs Organization's Regional Training Centre for Asia Pacific. Also, as a recognised centre for capacity building, NACIN conducts programs in the field of environment protection (Ozone Depleting Substances training) in collaboration with the United Nations Environment Program and modules for training on drug law enforcement with the United Nations Office on Drugs and Crime. The Government of India has entrusted NACIN the responsibility of knowledge exchange, experience sharing and training with various countries of the world.

Campus facilities

Academic infrastructure

The Academy at Faridabad is equipped with all facilities required by a training institute of its standing. These include admin block with 5 lecture rooms each with audio-visual equipment, conference halls, 300+ seats indoor auditorium, 400+ seats open air amphitheatre, library, officers mess, computer labs, swimming pool, gymnasium, sports facilities, post office, ATM, 3 hostels for officer trainees and 1 VIP guest house for visitors, and residential quarters for the academy faculty and staff.

Trainee and guests accommodation

There are 2 hostels, Alaknanda and Bhagirathi, each with 32 rooms with attached bath, air-conditioned officers' lounge, TV room, Musicsystems, billiards room, squash courts basketball, lawn tennis and other outdoor games. Additionally, there is Mandakini Guest Houses with 20 ac rooms with tv and fridge for visitors as well and an International Hostel for the overseas trainees with 12 suites for senior officers and dignitaries. All of these hostels and guest houses have power backup, room attendants and solar water heater.

Other campuses

Center Of Excellence at Delhi 
NACIN has a Center Of Excellence at New Delhi at CBEC premises. for research work in the field of Indirect Tax and related areas.

Zonal and Regional Training Institutes
NACIN has its Headquarter at Faridabad, Haryana with Zonal Centres/Academies and Regional Centres/Training Institutes across the country. 4 Zonal Centres/Academies are situated at Delhi, Chennai, Mumbai and Kolkata; Regional Centres/Training Institutes are situated at Cochin, Bengaluru, Patna, Kanpur, Vadodara, Hyderabad, Shillong, Bhopal, Vishakapatnam, Bhubaneswar, Chandigarh, Jaipur, Raipur and Ranchi.

A new NACIN regional centre is expected to come up in Hindupur, Anantapur district of Andhra Pradesh. The Foundation Stone for the same was laid at the proposed site by Union Finance Minister Shri Arun Jaitley and Andhra Pradesh Chief Minister Shri N.Chandrababu Naidu in April 2015, the institute is among the national institutes promised to the State by the Centre ahead of bifurcation.

See also

 Chartered Institute of Taxation
 List of educational institutions in Gurgaon
 List of institutions of higher education in Haryana
 List of universities in India

References

External links
 Ministry of Finance official website
 CBEC official website
 UPSC official website

Ministry of Finance (India)
Public administration schools in India
Custom and excise duties in India